The discography of Teenage Fanclub, a Scottish rock band, consists of 11 studio albums, two compilation album, two extended plays and 33 singles.

Albums

Studio albums

Collaboration albums

Compilation albums

Singles and EPs

Other appearances

References

Discographies of British artists